The Tierp Arena is a motorsport venue in Tierp, Uppsala County, Sweden, located 120 kilometers from Stockholm.
Tierp Arena is one of the most modern drag racing arenas in the world, with capacity for 20,000 spectators.

A new 2.51 kilometres (1.56 mi) racing circuit was constructed for the 2012 TTA – Racing Elite League. The track is built with F1 tracks like Hockenheim and Silverstone as model. Four-time Swedish champion Richard Göransson has been advisor. The track offers one of Sweden's longest straights, open hairpins and fast, challenging corners. TTA raced on the track on 15 September. The merged STCC – Racing Elite League visited the track in September 2013.

References

External links 
 
 Tierp Arena on TTA website
 TTA on Touring Car Times website

Motorsport venues in Sweden
Drag racing venues in Europe
Buildings and structures in Uppsala County
Tierps Municipality